The Chilote mythology or Chilota mythology is formed by the myths, legends and beliefs of the people who live in the Chiloé Archipelago, in the south of Chile. This mythology reflects the importance of the sea in the life of Chilotes.

Chilote mythology is based on a mixture of indigenous religions and beliefs from the natives (the Chonos and Huilliches) that live in the Archipelago of Chiloé, and the legends and superstitions brought by the Spanish conquistadores, who in 1567 began the process of conquest in Chiloé and with it the fusion of elements that would form a separate mythology.

Chilota mythology flourished, isolated from other beliefs and myths in Chile, due to the separation of the archipelago from the rest of the Spanish occupation in Chile, when the Mapuches occupied or destroyed all the Spanish settlements between the Bío-Bío River and the Chacao channel following the disaster of Curalaba in 1598.

Hierarchy of mythical creatures
The highest rank belongs to the sea serpents Tenten Vilu and Caicai Vilu, who in a legendary, titanic battle, created the Archipelago. Below Caicai Vilu is the Millalobo as the king of the seas, and his wife, the Huenchula. Their three children, the Pincoy, the prince of the sea, and the Pincoya and Sirena chilota, princesses, aid them in the work of ruling the seas. Below these are the different mythical creatures, given ranks by the Millalobo.

Earthly creatures have no hierarchy.

Human Beings in Mythology

Certain people are said to have magical powers. Witches have the ability to fly and have various creatures such as the Invunche under their command. In addition there are machis, people who play an important role in Mapuche culture and religion, though their functions and characteristics for the Chilote are somewhat different.

Other creatures

Legends and mythical creatures

Myths and mythical creatures of Chiloé, in southern Chile include:
The Basilisco Chilote (a type of Basilisk)
The Brujo Chilote (a type of sorcerer)
The Caballo marino chilote (a type of water horse)
The Caleuche
The Camahueto
The Cape or Skin
The Carbunclo
The Chucao
The Cuchivilu
The Coñieuma (a double flower that screams as a child on new moon)
The Fiura
La Condená ("The Condemned")
The macabre Invunche
Chiloé (mythological origin). The legend of Ten ten Vilu, Coi coi Vilu and Origin of the Archipelago
The Millalobo
The Peuchen or Piguchen
The Pésame
The Pincoya, goddess of the Chiloean Seas
The Pincoy
The Sirena chilota (a type of Mermaid)
The Trauco

Media
The myths from Chiloe appear in The Luke Coles Book Series by Josh Walker, a Young Adult Urban Fantasy series where the myths form the base for much of the lore in the novels.

See also
Mapuche mythology
Chilean mythology
Chiloé

References

 
 Isabel Vidal Miranda. Folklore, mitos y leyendas del archipielago de Chiloé. Mito, 1976.

External links